Graham Barnett is the name of:

Graham Barnett (footballer) (1936–2019), English footballer
Graham Barnett (priest) (born 1885), New Zealand priest